Klaudia Tanner ( Wallner, born 2 May 1970) is an Austrian politician of the People's Party (ÖVP) who has been serving as Minister of Defense in the government of Chancellor Sebastian Kurz since January 2020. From 2011 to 2020, she worked as the General Manager of Austria's political farmers' association.

Early life and education 
Tanner was born in the small town of Scheibbs in Lower Austria. Early in her career, she worked in the cabinet of Minister of the Interior Ernst Strasser from 2001 to 2003 and for IT company Kapsch BusinessCom, a subsidiary of Kapsch from 2003 to 2010.

Political career 
Already in the negotiations on a coalition government under Chancellor Sebastian Kurz following the 2017 elections, Tanner was considered as potential cabinet minister.

After the 2019 elections, Tanner was appointed as Minister of Defense by Kurz in January 2020, making her the first woman to hold the position. 

Under Tanner's leadership, Austria mobilized its military reservists for the first time since World War Two, asking them to fight the COVID-19 pandemic by helping with food supplies, medical support and police operations. Her ministry also ordered 18 Leonardo AW169M helicopters in a deal with Italy in September 2020, replacing its fleet of 50-year-old Aérospatiale Alouette III helicopters.

Personal life 
Tanner lives in Gresten. She is married and has a daughter.

References

External links 
Klaudia Tanner on the Austrian Parliament website
Klaudia Tanner on the Landtag of Lower Austria website
Klaudia Tanner on the Federal Ministry of Defence website

1970 births
Living people
Female defence ministers
People from Scheibbs District
21st-century Austrian women politicians
21st-century Austrian politicians
Austrian Ministers of Defence
Government ministers of Austria
Austrian People's Party politicians
Women government ministers of Austria